Lega is a Bantu language, or dialect cluster, of the Democratic Republic of the Congo. There are two major varieties, Shabunda Lega and Mwenga Lega; Mwenga Lega, with about 10% of speakers, finds Shabunda difficult to understand. Kanu has been assigned a separate ISO code but is a dialect of Shabunda, and no more divergent than other dialects. 

Variant spellings of 'Lega' are Rega, Leka, Ileka, Kilega, Kirega. Shabunda is also known as Igonzabale, and Mwenga as Shile or Ishile. Gengele is reported to be a Shabunda-based creole.

According to Ethnologue, Bembe is part of the same dialect continuum. Nyindu is a dialect of Shi that has been heavily influenced by Lega.

References

Lega-Binja languages